Mick Todd (born 6 June 1972) is a former professional English darts player who plays in the Professional Darts Corporation events.

He earned a PDC Tour Card in 2011 and 2014, and qualified for the 2014 UK Open and 2017 UK Open, but lost in the third round on both occasions. He beat 2018 NUDL Singles semi-finalist Jack “On The Beers” Mears in the first round of the 2019 Riley's UK Open Qualifiers.

Todd left the PDC in 2021.

References

External links
Profile and stats on Darts Database

1972 births
Living people
English darts players
Sportspeople from Newark-on-Trent